Calcium fructoborate is a salt of an organoboron compound containing boron (and fructose and calcium). Its structural formula is Ca[(C6H10O6)2B]2.

It is naturally found in some plants, and is also manufactured and promoted as a dietary supplement.

References

Calcium compounds